Moradlu (also Romanized as Morādlū; also known as Ahmadi, Aḩmadlū, and Akhmety) is a village in Minjavan-e Gharbi Rural District, Minjavan District, Khoda Afarin County, East Azerbaijan Province, Iran. At the 2006 census, its population was 33, in 10 families.

References 

Populated places in Khoda Afarin County